Gouri Elo is an Indian Bengali language television series that broadcasting on Indian Bengali general entertainment channel Zee Bangla and is also available on the digital platform ZEE5. The series is produced by Crazy Ideas Media. It stars Mohona Maiti and Biswarup Bandyopadhyay in lead roles. It premiered on 28 February 2022.

Plot
Dr. Ishan does not believe in God, but Gouri believes in God in her heart. With the arrival of Gouri, the gate of the temple is opened automatically, the veil of Goddess Kali's head is raised at the first sight of Gouri. As per the plot of the story, the doctor believes worship is superstition, to which Gouri replies, "Maybe from tomorrow you will trust the most".

Cast

Main
 Mohona Maiti as Gouri Ghoshal (Female Lead)
 Biswarup Bandyopadhyay as Dr. Ishan Ghoshal (Male Lead)

Recurring
 Samata Das as Sujata: Gouri's mother
 Arindol Bagchi as Nibaron: Gouri's father
 Sinchana Sarkar as Tiya: Gouri's sister
 Chandreyi Ghosh as Shailaja Ghoshal aka Shailamaa: Ishan's aunt, A corrupt self-proclaimed godwoman.
 Bhaswar Chatterjee as Atanu Ghoshal: Ishan's uncle; Madhuri's husband.
 Mousumi Saha as Arundhati Ghoshal: Ishan's paternal grandaunt; Rasamay's wife; Shailaja and Devtanu's mother.
 Sumanta Mukherjee as Rasamay Ghoshal: Ishan's paternal granduncle; Arundhati's husband; Shailaja and Devtanu's father.
 Bodhisattwa Majumdar as Shukhamay Ghoshal: Ishan's grandfather; Most senior member of Ghoshal family.
 Dwaipayan Das as Devtanu Ghoshal: Ishan's uncle, Anandi's husband, Chiku's father.
 Kanyakumari Mukherjee / Sujata Daw as Madhuri Ghoshal : Atanu's wife
 Sreetama Roy Chowdhury as Neela Chatterjee (née Ghoshal): Ishan's sister, Rupam's wife
 Rohit Mukherjee as Shantanu Ghoshal: Ishan's father and Sreemoti's husband
 Anindita Das as Sreemoti Ghoshal: Ishan's mother and Shantanu's wife
 Olivia Malakar as Mukta Ghoshal: Ishan's cousin sister; Atanu and Madhuri's daughter
 Ankita Biswas as Pola (née Ghoshal): Ishan's cousin sister; Atanu and Madhuri's daughter
 Ankita Majumder as Anandi Ghoshal: Ishan's aunt; Devtanu's wife,Chiku's mother.
 Aarush Dey as Chiku Ghoshal: Anandi and Devtanu's Son
 Raj Bhattacharya as Rupam Chatterjee :Ishan's brother-in-law, Neela's husband 
 Amitava Das as Dr. Arnab Mitra: Ishan's partner
 Gora Dhar as Sanatan Sapui
 Ritu Rai Acharya as Rumela
 Goutam Halder as Dhurjoti Baba: A corrupt self-proclaimed godman.
 Tanushree Bhattacharya Bose as Devi Ghomta Kali
 Pradip Dhar as Zamindar 
 Pritha Bandyopadhyay as Zamindar's wife
 Priyam as Hemendra Narayan
 Nandini Dutta as Ganga
 Arkajyoti Paul Chaudhury as Nur Alam Surya: Pola's husband
 Shuvanan Dutta as Rony: Surya's friend

Reception

TRP Ratings

2022

2023

Adaptations

Special Episodes
 On 24 October 2022, Gouri Elo held a mega episode titled as "Kali Puja Special" which is aired for non-stop two hours on Monday.

References

Zee Bangla original programming
Bengali-language television programming in India
2022 Indian television series debuts
Indian drama television series